Walter Scott West (March 13, 1872 – September 14, 1943) was a private serving in the United States Marine Corps during the Spanish–American War who received the Medal of Honor for bravery.

Biography
West was born on March 13, 1872, in Bradford, New Hampshire. He joined the Marine Corps from Boston in May 1897. He initially received a bad conduct discharge in January 1899, which was upgraded to honorable in 1932.

West died on September 14, 1943, and is buried at Rock Hill Cemetery in Foxboro, Massachusetts.

Medal of Honor citation
Rank and organization: Private, U.S. Marine Corps. Born: 13 March 1872, Bradford, N.H. Accredited to: New Hampshire. G.O. No.: 521, 7 July 1899.

Citation:

On board the U.S.S. Marblehead during the operation of cutting the cable leading from Cienfuegos, Cuba, 11 May 1898. Facing the heavy fire of the enemy, West displayed extraordinary bravery and coolness throughout this action.

See also

List of Medal of Honor recipients for the Spanish–American War

References

External links

1872 births
1943 deaths
American military personnel of the Spanish–American War
Burials in Massachusetts
United States Marine Corps Medal of Honor recipients
People from Bradford, New Hampshire
United States Marines
Spanish–American War recipients of the Medal of Honor